Ilan Bacha (born 5 March 2005) is a French professional footballer who plays as a midfielder for the French club Paris FC.

Club career
Bacha is a youth product of Paris FC since 2011, and signed his first aspirant contract with the club on 18 December 2020. He made his professional debut with Paris FC in a 2–1 Ligue 2 loss to Toulouse on 2 April 2022.

International career
Bacha was born in France and is of Algerian descent. He was called up to the France U16 in December 2020. He was called up to the Algeria U17s in February 2021.

References

External links
 
 FFF Profile

2005 births
Living people
People from Saumur
French footballers
French sportspeople of Algerian descent
Association football midfielders
Paris FC players
Ligue 2 players
Sportspeople from Maine-et-Loire
Footballers from Pays de la Loire